A Christmas Album is the fifth album and first Christmas album by Bright Eyes released in 2002. The proceeds of the album go to the Nebraska AIDS Project.

"Have Yourself a Merry Little Christmas" appeared in the films Imaginary Heroes and Krampus, and "Blue Christmas" was featured in an episode of The O.C., entitled "The Best Chrismukkah Ever". Initially released only online, it was released on 180 g white vinyl in 2009.

This album is the 48th release of Saddle Creek Records.

Track listing

Personnel
The album was arranged by Conor Oberst and Maria Taylor. The performers also include Jake Bellows, Gretta Cohn, Armand Costanzo, Denver Dalley, Stefanie Drootin, Orenda Fink, Neely Jenkins, Jiha Lee, Andy LeMaster, Mike Mogis, Matt Oberst, Stephen Pedersen, Blake Sennett, Macey Taylor, and Nick White.

References

External links
Nebraska AIDS Project

Bright Eyes (band) albums
Saddle Creek Records albums
2002 Christmas albums
Christmas albums by American artists